The St. Thomas Episcopal Church in Alamosa, Colorado is a historic Mission Revival-style church at 607 Fourth Street.  It was built in 1926 and was added to the National Register of Historic Places in 2003.

A church was built on the site in 1882, but was demolished in 1930 when a sanctuary addition was created.  The church's parish hall was built in 1926, designed by Denver architects William Ellsworth Fisher and Arthur Addison Fisher.

References

Buildings and structures in Alamosa, Colorado
Episcopal church buildings in Colorado
Mission Revival architecture in Colorado
Churches on the National Register of Historic Places in Colorado
Churches completed in 1926
National Register of Historic Places in Alamosa County, Colorado
Churches in Colorado